Cuero is a city in and the county seat of DeWitt County, Texas, United States. Its population was 8,128 at the 2020 census.

History
The city of Cuero had its start in the mid-19th century as a stopping point on the Chisholm Trail cattle route to Kansas. It was not recognized as a town until 1873, though, when it was officially founded. The city was named for the Spanish word "hide", referring to the leather made from animal hides. The industry was extremely short-lived, however, and gave way to various forms of ranching. The city had several Old West gunfights related to clan feuding following the Civil War.

Cuero's population grew considerably in the 1870s and 1880s, as residents from the coastal town of Indianola, Texas, settled here after major hurricanes in this period destroyed sizeable portions of that city. Cuero thrived through much of the late 19th and early 20th centuries by the introduction and practice of turkey ranching in the area. Today, agriculture is still the primary industry in the region. Cuero is considered to be one of the top cattle producers and shippers in Texas.

Geography
Cuero is located east of the center of DeWitt County near the mouth of Sandies Creek, where it empties into the Guadalupe River.

U.S. Routes 87, 77 Alternate, and 183 pass through the city. All three highways follow South Esplanade Street into the center of town; US 87 then leaves town via East Broadway Street, while US 77A and 183 continue north out of town on North Esplanade Street. US 87 leads southeast  to Victoria and west  to San Antonio. US 77 Alternate leads northeast  to Yoakum, and US 183 leads north  to Gonzales. Both 77 Alternate and 183  lead south  to Goliad.

Climate
The climate in this area is characterized by hot, humid summers and generally mild to cool winters.  According to the Köppen climate classification, Cuero has a humid subtropical climate, Cfa on climate maps. Cuero has an annual average precipitation of 38.0 in (965.2 mm), all rain, as snow is negligible in the area.

Demographics

As of the 2020 United States census, there were 8,128 people, 2,323 households, and 1,472 families residing in the city.

As of the census of 2000, 6,571 people, 2,500 households, and 1,695 families resided in the city. The population density was 1,331.1 people per square mile (513.6/km). The 2,867 housing units had an average density of 580.8 per sq mi (224.1/km). The racial makeup of the city was 67.25% White, 16.71% African American, 0.61% Native American, 0.52% Asian, 12.84% from other races, and 2.07% from two or more races. Hispanics or Latinos of any race were 34.73% of the population.

Of the 2,500 households, 33.0% had children under the age of 18 living with them, 47.2% were married couples living together, 16.0% had a female householder with no husband present, and 32.2% were not families. About 29.2% of all households were made up of individuals, and 16.6% had someone living alone who was 65 years of age or older. The average household size was 2.54 and the average family size was 3.13.

In the city, the age distribution was 27.1% under 18, 8.5% from 18 to 24, 24.4% from 25 to 44, 20.3% from 45 to 64, and 19.7% who were 65 or older. The median age was 38 years. For every 100 women, there were 86.1 men. For every 100 women age 18 and over, there were 80.6 men.

The median income for a household in the city was $24,931, and for a family was $29,500. Men had a median income of $26,154 versus $16,551 for women. The per capita income for the city was $14,286. About 21.5% of families and 26.8% of the population were below the poverty line, including 34.6% of those under age 18 and 20.1% of those age 65 or over.

Arts and culture
Turkey Fest is a local festival during which the townsfolk compete with people at various turkey-centric events. The competitions revolve around the turkeys each town raises and in which each takes immense pride. The events are the prettiest turkey contest, turkey toss, turkey trot, and turkey race. Unlike most turkey trots, where humans do the racing, in Cuero, the "turkey trot" involves racing actual turkeys.

In 1972, Charles Kuralt did an "On the Road" report for CBS News from Cuero, where he did his own turkey call.

Christmas in Cuero began in 2000 with the lighting of the gazebo in Cuero Municipal Park. It has grown to over 100 displays of Victorian and Western scenes, 12-car trains, gingerbread houses, and other scenes. A live nativity scene is sponsored by a church in Cuero. Two of the scenes were vandalized by two teens in November 2009. The park was still open to the public excluding the two damaged scenes. The teens arrested for the crime had their bonds set at $150,000, in part because of the effect the crime had on the community.

Parks and recreation
Cuero has many places for recreation, including a baseball complex, a golf course, volleyball courts, tennis courts, a basketball pavilion, and a park area with access to public swimming pool.

Education
The City of Cuero is served by the Cuero Independent School District. John C. French serves prekindergarten and kindergarten, Hunt Elementary serves grades 1–3, Cuero Intermediate School serves grades 4–6, Cuero Junior High serves grades 7–8, and Cuero High School serves grades 9–12.

In addition, the City of Cuero is served by St. Michael's Catholic School.  Providing education for the children of DeWitt County for over 130 years, the school has a fully accredited early childhood program (prekindergarten to grade 4) and offers education for  kindergarten-grade 6.

Notable people

 Frank Bass, professor and inventor of the Bass diffusion model
 MSG Roy Benavidez, Medal of Honor recipient
 Alois Blackwell, NFL player
Robert E. Blake, lawyer and athlete
 Leo Frank, lynching victim
 Fred Hansen, Olympic champion pole vaulter
 Frank Horton, U.S. Congressman for New York
 Henry Joseph Huck (1822–1905), once "the leading lumberman and supplier of building materials in the young State of Texas" and the first judge of Calhoun County, Texas, 
 Caesar Kleberg, conservationist
 Barr McClellan, lawyer, author (Blood, Money & Power: How LBJ Killed JFK), entrepreneur
 Jo Morrow and actress
 Sam Neely (1948–2006), country/folk musician and writer
 Aurora Estrada Orozco (1918–2011), Mexican-American community leader
 Robert Strait, high-school football running back
 Cody Wallace, NFL player
 Arthur Whittington, NFL player

See also
 Terrell-Reuss Streets Historic District

References

External links

 City of Cuero official website
 Cuero Chamber of Commerce

Cities in Texas
Cities in DeWitt County, Texas
County seats in Texas
Populated places on the Guadalupe River (Texas)